David John McLean (born 24 November 1957) is an English footballer who played as a central midfielder.

He started his career with hometown club Newcastle United but found opportunities limited. McLean moved on to Carlisle United but established himself as a regular when he signed for Darlington in 1979.

McLean enjoyed a successful seven-year stay at Darlington. A key player in midfield, he helped the side win promotion under Cyril Knowles in 1985. He moved on to Scunthorpe United in 1986, and later joined Whitley Bay. In 2003, he was voted as part of Darlington's all-time XI to coincide with the club's departure from Feethams.

Honours

As a player
Darlington
Football League Fourth Division third place: 1984–85

References

External links

Player Profile

1957 births
Living people
Footballers from Newcastle upon Tyne
English footballers
English Football League players
Association football midfielders
Newcastle United F.C. players
Carlisle United F.C. players
Darlington F.C. players
Scunthorpe United F.C. players
Whitley Bay F.C. players